Azheekal Beach is an 800 meter long beach on the coast of the Arabian Sea, in Karunagappally Taluk of Kollam Metropolitan Area, Kerala, India.  The beach got this name from the Malayalam word Aazhee, which means confluence of backwaters and the Sea.

More www.azheekal.com

Location 
Azheekal beach is located at the northern end of the land mass of Alappad peninsula in the district of Kollam in Kerala.

It is 12 km (7.45 mi) away from Kayamkulam and 14 km (8.69 mi) away from Karunagappally. It can be accessed through Azheekal-Ayiramthengu bridge, Panikkar Kadavu bridge or Kallum moottil kadavu bridge.

Azheekal Fishing Harbour is located near the beach.

It was impacted by the 2004 Indian Ocean earthquake and tsunami.

More www.azheekal.com

References

External links

Beaches of Kollam district